Qing'an County is a county of west-central Heilongjiang province, People's Republic of China. It is under the jurisdiction of the prefecture-level city of Suihua.

Administrative divisions 
Qing'an County is divided into 4 subdistricts, 8 towns and 6 townships. 
3 subdistricts
 Jikang, Qingrui, Pingshun, Antai
8 towns
 Qing'an, Minyue, Daluo, Ping'an, Qinlao, Jiusheng, Tongle, Liuhe
6 townships
 Jianmin, Jubaoshan, Fengshou, Fazhan, Zhifu, Huansheng

Demographics 

Climate

Notes and references

External links 
  Government Site - 

Qing'an
Qing'an County
Suihua